Hallow is a village and civil parish beside the River Severn, about  north-west of Worcester in Worcestershire. The village is on the A443 road that links Worcester with Holt Heath.

Hallow has a public house, a post office and a Church of England primary school.

Following the Poor Law Amendment Act 1834 Grimley Parish, of which Hallow was then part, ceased to be responsible for maintaining the poor in its parish. This responsibility was transferred to Martley Poor Law Union.

History

Prehistory

There is evidence of human presence from the paleolithic period, roughly 700,000-500,000 years ago. Flint axe heads were found near Hallow in the 1970s.

Toponym
In the 9th century the toponym was recorded as Halhegan, Heallingan and Halnegan. In the 11th century it was recorded as Halhegan and Hallhagan, while in the 13th century it was Hallawe, Hallaye or Hallag.

Manor
The earliest record of the manor of Hallow is from AD 816, during the reign of Coenwulf of Mercia, when Hallow evidently belonged to Worcester Cathedral, and by the 10th century Hallow belonged to the Benedictine priory attached to the cathedral. After the Dissolution of the Monasteries around 1540 the cathedral retained Hallow, and in 1913 the manor was vested in the Ecclesiastical Commissioners.

By the middle of the 11th century Worcester Priory had fishponds at Hallow and in 1256 permission was granted for a warren as well. Both were still in use in 1346.

The Domesday Book records that in 1086 Hallow had two mills for grinding grain: presumably watermills on the River Severn. Hallow Mill was still in use in 1913.

Queen Elizabeth came to hunt deer with bow and arrow at Hallow Park on 18 August 1575.

Parish church
Until 1876 Hallow was a chapelry of Grimley.

In 1867 the second chapel was demolished and building began of the present Church of England parish church of Saint Philip and Saint James. It was designed by W.J. Hopkins and completed in 1869. Hallow was made a separate parish in 1876.

The church is W.J. Hopkins' most notable work. The nave and clerestorey are of four bays and are flanked by north and south aisles. The clerestorey is supported by flying buttresses and, like a number of Hopkins' works, has round windows. The chancel and its arch are impressively high. 17th and 18th century memorial tablets from the old chapel were preserved and are mounted in the new church.

The old chapel had three bells in 1552 and five in 1740. A 16th-century bell from the old chapel hung in the new church until 1900, when a new peal of eight bells cast by John Taylor & Co of Loughborough was hung in the tower.

Notable people
Colonel William Careless, who preserved the life of Charles II by hiding him in the Royal Oak (1651), was resident in Hallow during the 1680s.

The manufacturer and philanthropist William Morris (1877–1963), the future Viscount Nuffield, was born in Hallow and baptised at SS Philip and James.

The diplomat, archeologist, explorer and historian Stewart Perowne was born in Hallow in 1901.

Sir Charles Bell (1774–1842) died in Hallow en route from Edinburgh to London and is buried in the churchyard.

References

Sources

Villages in Worcestershire